Sati Anasuya is a story that has been made into many Indian films in different languages. It has been made into the Telugu language in 1935, 1936, 1957 and 1971.

Plot
The story of Anasuya is the basis for these films with some cinematic changes.

Sati Anasuya (1935 film)

It is produced by Aurora Film Corporation based in Calcutta. Dasari Kotiratnam played the title role of Anasuya.

Cast
 Dasari Kotiratnam as Anasuya
 Tungala Chalapati Rao as Narada

Anasuya (1936 film)

Cast
 C. Krishnaveni
 Prakash Rao
 Suryanarayana
 Narayanrao
 P. Sundaramma
 R. Balasaraswathi Devi
 C. S. R

Sati Anasuya (1957 film)

Cast
 Anjali Devi as Anasuya
 Gummadi
 N.T.Rama Rao

Soundtrack
Music is by Ghantasala. Playback singers are Ghantasala, M. S. Rama Rao, Madhavapeddi Satyam, J. V. Raghavulu, M. L. Vasanthakumari, P. Leela, Jikki, P. Leela & K. Rani.

Sati Anasuya (1971 film)

Cast
 Jamuna as Anasuya
 Sharada as Sumati
 Kanta Rao as Atri Maharshi
Prabhakar Reddy as Shiva
Sobhan Babu as Narada
Rajanala as Sivanandam
Rajababu as Sukhanandam
Satyanarayana
Venniradai Nirmala

Soundtrack
 "Aalayamela Archanalela Aradhanalela" (Singer: P. Susheela)
 "Enni Janmala Enni Nomula Punyamo" (Singer: P. Susheela)
 "Himagiri Mandira Girija Sundara" (Singer: P. Susheela)by

External links
 

1930s Telugu-language films
1950s Telugu-language films
1970s Telugu-language films